Olivia Frances Blake (born 10 March 1990) is a British Labour politician. She was elected as the Member of Parliament (MP) for Sheffield Hallam at the 2019 general election.

Early life
Blake grew up in Otley, a market town north of Leeds, West Yorkshire. She was educated at Prince Henry's Grammar School, the local comprehensive school. She studied Biomedical Science at the University of Sheffield.

Political career

Offices within the Labour Party (2013–present)
In 2013, Blake stood in the election for the Youth Representative on Labour's National Executive Committee and came second. She campaigned to introduce 'one member one vote' elections for internal positions and was supported by the Labour Party's left-wing. 
 
In 2018, Blake was elected to Labour's National Policy Forum with the endorsement of the left-wing groups Momentum and the Centre-Left Grassroots Alliance.

Sheffield City Councillor (2014–2020)
Blake unsuccessfully stood in the 2 May 2013 by-election for the Fulwood ward of Sheffield City Council before being elected as a local councillor to the Walkley ward of Sheffield City Council in 2014, 2015 and 2016.

Blake was elected Deputy Leader of the Council in April 2017. Blake said she was elected as Deputy Leader "on a ticket of reform", and worked to in-source council contracts and tackle privatisation. As Deputy Leader, the Council brought its Revenues and Benefits services in-house from outsourcing giant Capita; Blake said that "bringing these services back in-house" would give the Council "greater control and allow [it] to adapt and respond as the city’s priorities develop locally". Before she left her position Blake initiated the process to bring "digital services and cleaning contracts" in-house. She also supported a campaign to initiate a pilot scheme of universal basic income in Sheffield.

Blake later resigned as Deputy Leader to support a grassroots movement to change the democratic structure of the council, remaining as a councillor. She later resigned from the Council following her election as an MP. In an article she wrote for Tribune magazine, Blake said this was to show support for "a new way of doing politics in our city". She indicated that she intends to "contribute a socialist voice to the referendum debate", to open up a "wider discussion on how to rejuvenate our democracy in Sheffield."

Member of Parliament (2019–present)

Blake was selected as the prospective Labour Party candidate in Sheffield Hallam in December 2018. She was elected as the Member of Parliament at the December 2019 general election.

She nominated Rebecca Long-Bailey in the 2020 Labour Party leadership election and Angela Rayner in the 2020 Labour Party deputy leadership election. In February 2020, Blake was elected as the Treasurer of the All-Party Parliamentary Group on Myalgic Encephalomyelitis (ME). Blake was elected to Parliament's Public Accounts Committee in March 2020.

Blake was appointed to the frontbench as Parliamentary Private Secretary to Andy McDonald, Shadow Secretary of State for Transport, in January 2020. Following the election of Keir Starmer, she was appointed in April as PPS jointly to Jo Stevens, Shadow Secretary of State for Digital, Culture, Media and Sport, and Ian Murray, Shadow Secretary of State for Scotland.

Blake is Vice-Chair of the Bakers, Food and Allied Workers' Union Parliamentary Group.

After Wetherspoons' owner Tim Martin was inaccurately reported to have told his 43,000 employees that they would not be furloughed during the COVID-19 pandemic, and should go work at Tesco, as Vice-Chair of the BFAWU Parliamentary Group, Blake coordinated a cross-party letter of 95 MPs to calling on Martin to "put people and not profits first" and continue to pay Wetherspoons workers.

Blake was forced to resign from her position as PPS to Jo Stevens and Ian Murray in September 2020 when she, alongside 18 other Labour MPs, including two other junior office holders, Beth Winter and Nadia Whittome, defied the Labour whip and voted against the Overseas Operations Bill.

On 14 May 2021, Blake was appointed as the Shadow Minister for Nature, Water and Flooding. In the November 2021 shadow cabinet reshuffle, Blake was moved to serve as the Shadow Minister for Climate Change. She resigned from this role on 15 June 2022, citing personal reasons.

Policies and views
Blake is a member of the Socialist Campaign Group, the left grouping of Labour Party Members of Parliament in the House of Commons of the United Kingdom.

A Vice article described Blake as "keen to make clear [her] support for trans rights and the entire LGBTQ+ community".

Blake supported Britain remaining in the European Union, saying in November 2019 that she would campaign to remain in a potential second referendum on the issue.

In her maiden speech to Parliament, Blake said that the Sheffield Hallam constituency had a "very long history of social justice", as Robin Hood mythology points to a Yorkshire origin in Loxley. She said that Robin of Loxley means she was "not the first person in Sheffield Hallam to stand on a platform of redistributing wealth."

Blake is a supporter of a "Green New Deal" for the UK, and passionate about the issue of climate change. Blake has expressed support for improved transport links for Sheffield to address the climate crisis. In 2020, she wrote to the transport secretary asking him to consider the reopening of the Millhouses and Ecclesall station, suggesting it would reduce congestion in the area. Alongside Louise Haigh, Blake has launched a campaign to reopen railway stations along the Sheaf Valley line, seeking to reopen Millhouses and Heeley stations, and increase capability at Dore & Totley.

Blake discussed her experience of having a miscarriage in August 2020 in a parliamentary debate on Baby Loss in November 2020 and called for the three miscarriages rule where support was only offered after this point to be changed. This led to draft guidelines which scrapped this to be produced by the Royal College of Obstetricians and Gynaecologists in October 2021. She also successfully campaigned to allow one partner to be present at all times with pregnant mothers during the pandemic.

In March 2021, Blake announced that she had taken on the role of 'species champion' in Westminster Parliament for the threatened hen harrier.

Personal life
Blake's mother Judith Blake, Baroness Blake of Leeds is a Labour politician who led Leeds City Council from 2015 to 2021. She is married to Lewis Dagnall, a Sheffield City Councillor. Olivia Blake identifies as bisexual.

References

External links
Official website

1990 births
Living people
Female members of the Parliament of the United Kingdom for English constituencies
Labour Party (UK) MPs for English constituencies
People educated at Prince Henry's Grammar School, Otley
Politicians from Leeds
Alumni of the University of Sheffield
Councillors in Sheffield
21st-century British women politicians
Daughters of life peers
UK MPs 2019–present
21st-century English women
21st-century English people
LGBT members of the Parliament of the United Kingdom
English LGBT politicians
Bisexual women
Women councillors in England
Labour Party (UK) councillors